The stages of death of a human being have medical, biochemical and legal aspects. The term taphonomy from palaeontology applies to the fate of all kinds of remains of organisms, with forensic taphonomy concerned for remains of the human body.

History 
The academic study of death is called thanatology, a field pioneered by Élie Metchnikoff in the early 20th century. Thanatology focuses on describing postmortem bodily modifications, as well as perspectives concerning psychosocial, medical, ethical, and spiritual aspects of death.

Definition of death 
Prior to the 1980s, the legal standard defined death as the absence of cardiopulmonary function including the loss of all vital signs. However, as medical technology advanced, there were situations where one might lose brain function and maintain cardiopulmonary function. This led the American Medical Association, the American Bar Association in collaboration with the National Conference of Commissioners on Uniform State Laws to come together in the 1980s to expand the definition of death through the Uniform Determination of Death Act (UDDA). Under this law, death can be defined as the loss of cardiopulmonary function or the loss of brain function including the brainstem and cortex.

Clinical signs and stages of death
Signs of death or strong indications that a warm-blooded animal is no longer alive are:

 Respiratory arrest (no breathing)
 Cardiac arrest (no pulse)
 Brain death (no neuronal activity)
The heart and lungs are vital organs for human life due to their ability to properly oxygenate human blood (lungs) and distribute this blood to all vital organs (heart). Hence failure of the heart to pump blood or the lungs to obtain oxygen can lead to a cardiopulmonary death where the heart stops pumping and there is no pulse. In the brain, this can be manifested by a hypoxic state which leads to cerebral edema and thus an increase in intracranial pressure. The rise in intracranial pressure can lead to further disruption in cerebral blood flow, leading to necrosis or tissue death. The aforementioned mechanism is the most common cause of brain death, however this increase in intracranial pressure does not always occur due to an arrest in cardiopulmonary function. Traumatic brain injuries and subarachnoid hemorrhages can also increase the intracranial pressure in the brain leading to a cessation of brain function and hence death. While cardiopulmonary death can be easily assessed by looking for the presence of a pulse, or identifying electrical activity through  EKG tracings, assessment of brain death is slightly more nuanced.  Per the United Kingdom Medical Royal Colleges, a diagnosis of brain death is a two-fold process including 1) identifying the cause of irreversible brain damage and excluding reversible causes of brain damage and 2) conducting a series of clinical and laboratory tests to assess brain stem function.

The definition of legal death, and its formal documentation in a death certificate, vary according to the jurisdiction. The certification applies to somatic death, corresponding to death of the person, which has varying definitions but most commonly describes a lack of vital signs and brain function.  Death at the level of cells, called molecular death or cell death, follows a matter of hours later. These distinctions, and the independence of physicians certifying legal death, are significant in organ procurement.

Post-mortem changes

Post-mortem changes refer to the series of changes that occur to a body after death. These changes can generally be divided between early post-mortem changes and late post-mortem changes (also known as decomposition). These changes occur along a continuum and can be helpful in determining the post-mortem interval, which is the time between death and examination.

The stages that follow shortly after death are:

 Corneal opacity or "clouding"
 , paleness which happens in the first 15–120 minutes after death
 , the reduction in body temperature following death. This is generally a steady decline until matching ambient temperature
 , the limbs of the corpse become stiff (Latin rigor) and difficult to move or manipulate
 , or dependent lividity, a settling of the blood in the lower (dependent) portion of the body
 Putrefaction, the beginning signs of decomposition

Of these, with obvious mortal damage to the body, the textbook conclusive signs of death clear to a lay person are: algor mortis, rigor mortis, livor mortis, and putrefaction.

The cardinal signs of death may refer to the ending of breathing, heartbeat and circulation, or to algor mortis, livor mortis and rigor mortis; the adoption of brain death as a definition has lessened the centrality of these signs. In a clearer contemporary terminology, algor mortis, livor mortis and rigor mortis are called "early postmortem" changes, in distinction from the "immediate postmortem" changes associated with the cessation of bodily functions, as indicated by vital signs. With an ophthalmoscope, changes to the blood in the retina are quickly visible.

Those stages are followed, in taphonomy, by

 Decomposition, the reduction into simpler forms of matter, accompanied by a strong, unpleasant odor.
 Skeletonization, the end of decomposition, where all soft tissues have decomposed, leaving only the skeleton.
 Fossilization, the natural preservation of the skeletal remains formed over a very long period. This stage may not occur, depending on the circumstances and the conditions of the surrounding environment.

Decomposition stages

Descriptions of decomposition have had varying numbers of discrete stages. A 5-stage process developed by Galloway and colleagues that is commonly used in forensic pathology is detailed below:

 Stage 1: Fresh – about half of bodies show signs of lividity and no signs of insects.
 Stage 2: Early Decomposition – Bacteria grow throughout the body, releasing gases, including cadaverine, which in turn bloat the body and cause an unpleasant odor.
 Stage 3: Advanced Decomposition – This stage brings further discoloration to the body. The gases from bacterial decay begin to escape, causing a strong odor.
 Stage 4: Skeletonization – The internal organs liquefy and the body begins to dry out.
 Stage 5: Extreme Decomposition – Advancing of the skeletonization with bleaching, exfoliation, and loss of wide portions of long bone.

See also
 Suspended animation
 Lazarus syndrome
 Cadaveric spasm

References

Medical aspects of death